Political corruption in Ghana has been common since independence. Since 2017, Ghana's score on Transparency International's Corruption Perceptions Index has improved slightly from its low point that year, a score of 40 on a scale from 0 ("highly corrupt") to 100 ("very clean").  In the succeeding years, Ghana's score has either risen or remained steady; in 2022, Ghana scored 43. When ranked by score among the 180 countries in the 2022 Index, Ghana ranked 72nd; the country ranked first is perceived to have the most honest public sector.  For comparison, the best score in 2022 was 90 (ranked 1), and the worst score was 12 (ranked 180).  

Even though corruption in Ghana is relatively low when compared to other countries in Africa, businesses frequently quote corruption as an obstacle for doing business in the country. Corruption occurs often in locally funded contracts, companies are subject to bribes when operating in rural areas.

In a 1975 book, Victor T. Le Vine wrote that bribery, theft and embezzlement arose from reversion to a traditional winner-takes-all attitude in which power and family relationships prevailed over the rule of law. Corruption in Ghana is comparatively less prevalent than in other countries in the region.

Ghana is not a signatory to the OECD Convention on Combating Bribery. It has, however, taken steps to amend laws on public financial administration and public procurement. The public procurement law, passed in January 2004, seeks to harmonize the many public procurement guidelines used in the country and also to bring public procurement into conformity with World Trade Organization standards. The new law aims to improve accountability, value for money, transparency and efficiency in the use of public resources.

However, some in civil society have criticized the law as inadequate. The government, in conjunction with civil society representatives, is drafting a Freedom of Information bill, which will allow greater access to public information. Notwithstanding the new procurement law, companies cannot expect complete transparency in locally funded contracts. There continue to be allegations of corruption in the tender process and the government has in the past set aside international tender awards in the name of national interest.

Businesses report being asked for "favours" from contacts in Ghana, in return for facilitating business transactions. The Government of Ghana has publicly committed to ensuring that government officials do not use their positions to enrich themselves. Official salaries, however, are modest, especially for low-level government employees, and such employees have been known to ask for a "dash" (tip) in return for assisting with licence and permit applications.

Areas of Corruption

Parliament 

Member of parliament for the Chiana-Paga constituency, Abuga Pele was convicted in February 2018 and charged with a six-year jail term for wilfully causing a loss of GH¢4.1 million to the state of Ghana. In June 2009, Mubarak Muntaka resigned from his position as Minister of Youth and Sports on the orders of president Mills following investigations into dozens of allegations levelled against him including financial malpractice and abuse of power. Ghana's Commission on Human Rights and Administrative Justice asked Mubarak Muntaka to refund misappropriated funds.

The Commission on Human Rights and Administrative Justice was petitioned by a pressure group in September 2009 to investigate Mahama Ayariga for acquiring 5 subsidized tractors from the ministry of Agriculture that were meant to support underprivileged farmers in rural communities. Appointments Committee of Parliament initially suspended his approval of becoming a minister pending investigations, that cleared him afterwards. Mahama Ayariga claimed that his application to acquire the tractors "was approved" and he was unaware that there was an "affordable arrangements" scheme associated with purchasing the tractors. The investigation was reopened in July 2017 when a different political party formed a new government.

Medicine 
In 2017,the then deputy minister of health, Kingsley Aboagye Gyedu, asserted that Ghana's health sector had high corruption rates because of its low level of accountability. For example, doctors at the Tamale Teaching hospital plant agents to direct patients from the hospital to their clinics and direct patients to procure drugs and lab tests outside the hospital thus reducing hospital revenue. They go into agreement with these pharmacies and labs so they profit from the referrals. Ghana's health sector was ranked second most corrupt in Africa, with most of the allocated public resources ending up in the pockets of corrupt private individuals.

The worst affected people are the poor individuals who are not sensitised on medical practices in the hospital. Medical practitioners end up selling watered-down medicines and even request bribes to allow patients jump queues. In Koforidua in the eastern region of Ghana, a combined team of US and Ghanaian medical professionals were supposed to undertake the "Operation Walk Syracuse", a surgical procedure for some selected arthritis patients. It was revealed that some of the local professionals in the St. Joseph's hospital had charged from prospective patients sums of money ranging from GHC100.00 to GHC6,000.00 to allow them access the procedure. Meanwhile, this was at the blind side of the US team.

Anti-corruption efforts 
The 1992 Constitution provided for the establishment of a Commission on Human Rights and Administrative Justice (CHRAJ). Among other things, the Commission is charged with investigating all instances of alleged and suspected corruption and the misappropriation of public funds by officials. The Commission is also authorized to take appropriate steps, including providing reports to the Attorney General and the Auditor-General, in response to such investigations. The Commission has a mandate to prosecute alleged offenders when there is sufficient evidence to initiate legal actions. The Commission, however, is under-resourced and few prosecutions have been made since its inception.

In 1998, the Government of Ghana also established an anti-corruption institution, called the Serious Fraud Office (SFO), to investigate corrupt practices involving both private and public institutions. A law to revise the SFO law is being drafted and it is expected to define more clearly treatment of the proceeds from criminal activities. The government also announced plans to streamline the roles of the CHRAJ and SFO, in order to remove duplication of efforts. The government passed a “Whistle Blower” law in July 2006, intended to encourage Ghanaian citizens to volunteer information on corrupt practices to appropriate government agencies. In December 2006, CHRAJ issued guidelines on conflict of interest to public sector workers. As of February 2009, a Freedom of Information bill was still pending in Parliament.

During the Anti-Corruption Summit in London on May 12, Ghana urged its delegates to sign these eight steps in hope of decreasing corruption: 
1. The public should know who owns and profits from companies, trusts and other legal entities.
2. We need tighter rules to stop corrupt money being spent on property and luxury goods.
3. Banks and businesses should be required to find out who they're dealing with, and report it if they come across shell companies or dodgy practices.
4. Companies buying oil, gas and minerals, and those in the defence and construction sectors must make details of their payments to any government, on any project, available to the public.
5. Companies should reveal how much tax they pay in every country they do business in.
6. All government contracting processes around the world should be open.
7. All government budgets around the world should be available for anyone to view.
8. Corruption hunters should have access to timely, comparable and relevant open data on the issues above as well as the technology that will allow them to work effectively.

On 7 February 2012, it was reported that four prominent supporters of Ghana’s ruling National Democratic Congress (NDC) had been arrested and charged with corruption in an Accra court. Alfred Agbesi Woyome was charged with crimes including corrupting public officials over a multi million-dollar payment that a government inquiry alleged he had claimed illegally. Chief attorney Samuel Nerquaye-Tetteh, his wife and the finance ministry's legal director were also charged with aiding and abetting a crime.

Following the numerous allegations of corruption levelled against some appointees of President John Dramani Mahama, an initiative was taken to help appointees avoid situations that would put them in a seeming situation of conflict of interest, hence guarding corruption. This led to the publication of the code of ethics for government appointees in 2013. Primarily, the code of ethics was to be the go-to document to enable officials know and  anticipate any situation that could compromise a public official.

The New Patriotic Party made it a campaign promise to fight corruption in the round up to the 2016 general election; it proposed, among other things, the establishment of the Office of the Special Prosecutor to handle all corruption related matters. Upon assuming governance in 2017, an Act of parliament was passed to create the office. The president sworn into office Martin Amidu as the first person to occupy the office, notwithstanding his affiliation to the opposition NDC.

Activists
Due to high levels of corruption incidences in Ghana, some Ghanaians have dedicated time, money and other resources to fight and curb corruption.
 Anas Aremeyaw Anas - An undercover investigative journalist whose works have led to the arrest and conviction of persons mainly in government, who were found to be engaged in corruption related practices. Ironically, Anas has, in some specific and outed instances, been cited in the very evils he supposedly stands against.
 Martin Amidu - Appointed to the Office of the Special Prosecutor by the Akuffo Addo government although he associates with the opposition National Democratic Congress, Amidu was a former deputy attorney general who was removed by the Atta Mills government for his perceived accusation of members of his own party on corruption charges. Unfortunately for Martin Amidu and the millions of Ghanaians who had put their hopes in him, little or nothing significant has come out after his appointment.
 Nana Akwasi Awuah
 Bright Simmons
 Manasseh Azure
 Emmanuel Wilson Jnr. The Chief Crusader- Crusaders Against Corruption, Ghana.
 Elizabeth Ohene

See also 
 Investigative works of Anas Aremeyaw Anas
 Crime in Ghana

References

External links
Ghana Corruption Profile from the Business Anti-Corruption Portal

 
Ghana
Corruption
Society of Ghana